Khejuri Assembly constituency is an assembly constituency in Purba Medinipur district in the Indian state of West Bengal. It is reserved for scheduled castes.

Overview
As per orders of the Delimitation Commission, No. 215 Khejuri Assembly constituency (SC) is composed of the following: Khejuri I and Khejuri II community development blocks, and Garbari I and Garbari II gram panchayats of Bhagabanpur II community development block.

Khejuri Assembly constituency (SC) is part of No. 31 Kanthi (Lok Sabha constituency).

Members of Legislative Assembly

Election results

2011

1977-2006
In the 2006 state assembly elections, Swadesh Patra of WBSP won the Khejuri assembly seat (SC) defeating his nearest rival Dr. Partha Pratim Das of Trinamool Congress. Contests in most years were multi-cornered, but only winners and runners are mentioned here. Sunirmal Paik of WBSP defeated Ram Chandra Mandal of Trinamool Congress in 2001. Ram Chandra Mandal representing CPI(M) defeated Sunirmal Paik representing Congress in 1996. Sunirmal Paik representing CPI(M) defeated Santiram Das of Congress in 1991. Sunirmal Paik, Independent, defeated Susanta Mandal of Congress in 1987 and 1982. Sunirmal Paik of Janata Party defeated Sunil Sit of CPI(M) in 1977.

1951-1972
Bimal Paik of Congress won in 1972. Jagadish Chandra Das of CPI(M) won in 1971. Paresh Das of Bangla Congress won in 1969. B.Paik of Congress won in 1967. Abanti Kumar Das of Congress won in 1962. The Khejuri seat was not there in 1957. Khejuri had a dual seat in independent India's first election in 1951. It was won by Koustav Kanti Karan and Abha Maiti, both of Congress.

References

Assembly constituencies of West Bengal
Politics of Purba Medinipur district